Ankang is a prefecture-level city in the south of Shaanxi Province in the People's Republic of China, bordering Hubei province to the east, Chongqing municipality to the south, and Sichuan province to the southwest.

History 
The settlement of Ankang dates to the Stone Age, and its recorded history dates back more than 3000 years. The settlement was originally known as Xicheng. Ankang County was established in 1st Taikang year of the Western Jin Dynasty  It later formed part of the Eastern Liang Prefecture, which was reorganized into the Jin Prefecture in the 3rd Feidi year of the Western Wei  Under the Sui, this was renamed Xicheng Commandery and, under the Tang, Ankang Commandery.

After the founding of the People's Republic of China (1949), the Ankang Office of the Shaanxi Province People's Government was set up in 1950, growing to become the Ankang Area Civic Administration in 1979. In 2001, Ankang Area became Ankang City with a city-level administration.

Geography 

Due to its location south of the Qinling, Ankang is geographically considered to be part of southern China, yet, on administrative terms, as Shaanxi is officially part of Northwestern China, it is considered to be part of the Northwest. Ankang is located in the southeastern part of Shaanxi, north of the Daba Mountains and south of the Qinling. The Han River (Hanshui) crosses it from west to east, forming a natural landform of "a plain between two mountains".

Climate
Ankang has a monsoon-influenced humid subtropical climate (Köppen Cwa), with cool, dry winters, and hot, humid summers. The monthly 24-hour average temperature ranges from 3.7 °C (38.3 °F) in January to 27.0 °C (80.4 °F) in July, while the annual mean is 15.7 °C (60.1 °F). Most of annual precipitation occurs from June to September.

Administrative divisions 
Ankang includes one District，one county-level city and eight counties, totaling 109 towns, 88 townships and 3 sub-district offices.

Culture 

Ankang's history and culture is nearly the same as Chinese culture, but with distinctive characteristics and geographical features marked by its diversity, which integrates east and west, north and south. It is influenced by Shaanxi culture, Chinese culture and Diqiang culture, with elements Bashu and Jinchu culture to form the present-day Han River culture after thousands of years of assimilation and fusion. The operas of Ankang have a long history, with nearly ten varieties, of which Han Opera is the best and most mature. According to incomplete statistics (?), the operas of Ankang consist of more than a thousand traditional plays. It is said that the tone of Beijing Opera originates from Han Opera. Ankang is well known as "the land for folk songs" and was named as "the land for folk songs in China" by the Ministry of Culture in 2003. Ziyang folk songs have become a cultural brand of Ankang. Ziyang folk songs and the Han tune "Erhuang" have been listed on the Intangible Cultural Heritage List by the State Council.

Tourism

Located at a rare zone abundant in subtropical resources in the northwest of China, Ankang is an intermediate zone between north and south China and a transition zone of different climates whose geographical features make it an area of high value for development. This includes the tourism potential of Qinba, Han River scenery and tourism for holidays and leisure. Ankang encompasses 32 scenic areas and 78 scenic spots, among which 29 places have potential for development, including some historic and scenic sites at the provincial level, such as Nangong Mountain National Forest Park, Ying Lake and Xiangxi Hole, as well as many historic and scenic sites or tourism projects such as Qianjia Ping, the origin of the Shen River, Pinghe Liang, rafting on the Lan River, etc. Ankang also has four national forest parks and seven forest parks at the provincial level.

Transportation
The Ankang Fuqiang Airport, which opened in September 2020, has flights to and from Xi'an and other cities. The highways G316 and G210 pass through the town.
Ankang is served by the Xi'an–Ankang, Yangpingguan–Ankang and Xiangyang–Chongqing Railways.

Economy

Biological resources 

Ankang is the subtropics continental monsoon climate with assembled biological resources. known as "the mountain of treasure in Qinba area", Ankang has more than 3300 kinds of biological species. There are 2157 kinds of trees, among which katsura tree, horse chestnut, Liriodendron, yew, ginkgo, Cephalotaxus, camphor, nanmu, wingceltis and so on are rare or unique in China, especially Davidia involucrata Baill (Also known as Chinese dove tree) growing in Zhenping County is called as living fossil 250 million years ago which is a rare species in the world. Ankang has a total of 430 kinds of wild animals, of which 34 were classified as national protective rare animals. Ankang is rich in Chinese herbal medicines, with more than 1290 kinds of species. The output of cocoon, Codonopsis pilosula, tea, raw Chinese lacquer, musk tops Shaanxi and the output of raw Chinese lacquer is well known in China. The development of Chinese herbal medicines mainly on Gynostemma pentaphylla, saponin and puerarin has formed industrial groups with certain size. Ankang's tea has a long production history, which is one of seven major tea-planted areas in China. There are 9 counties or districts produce tea, among which Ziyang, Liping, Hanbin, Langao, Han Yin and Shiquan are the main tea-producing areas. In 2006, the tea garden covered an area of 34.52 million mu in Ankang, with a total output of 4735 tons. Ankang is also the largest silkworm and silk production base in Shaanxi, even in the northwest of China whose cocoon output accounts for more than 80% of Shaanxi Province. Ankang is an important base for forest and animal husbandry. The grassland covers an area of 3,130,000 mu and the theoretical animal number of the grasslands is 3,120,000. The forest area is 1,993 mu and the forest coverage of Ankang is 56.5%. The stumpage has reached 55,540,000 cubic meters, accounting for 20.6% of Shaanxi's.

Water resources 

Ankang has many rivers and rich water resources. It takes up 59.5% of the total water resources in Shaanxi Province and the per-capita share of the water resources is 1.5 times as much as it in China, and 2.6 times in Shanxi. Han River, the biggest tributary of Yangtze River, is 340 kilometers long in Ankang. There are 11 rivers whose drainage area is above , such as Han River, Ziwu River, Wenshui River and so on. The average annual runoff of these rivers in the city is 10,657,000,000 cubic meters and the per-capita share of water resources is 3700 cubic meters. The reserves of hydro energy is theoretically 4,690,000 kW, accounting for 36.8% of the total reserves of hydro energy in Shaanxi Province. Three hydropower stations (Ankang, Shiquan and Xihe) in Han River have been built with installation of 1,100,000 kW. The water area for cultivation is 97000 mu taking up 25% of Ankang's total water cultivation area. The water area of Ankang hydropower station is the biggest man-made water area in Shaanxi Province, which is about 81400 mu. Han River, with crystal-clear and pollution-free water, is the important headwater in the midline of "South-to-North Water Diversion Project".

Mineral resources 

About 65 kinds of metals and non-metallic minerals have been found in Ankang, and 32 kinds have been proven valuable in the mining industry. The reserves of mercury, antimony, lead, zinc, gold, barite, witherite, slate tile, cement, limestone, turquoise are on the first rank of China or Shaanxi Province. Furthermore, the reserves of mercury and slate tile tops China, and the reserves of antimony, alluvial gold, barite, witherite, slate tile are on the top of Shaanxi. Mercury-antimony mine in Xunyang, the largest mercury-antimony mine in China, has a good market prospect.

Industrial development 
The plant base of green industry covers an area of more than four million mu. The output of cocoon makes up 80% of the total output of cocoon in Shaanxi. Turmeric, Gynostemma pentaphylla and the tea enriched in selenium have obtained the formulation right of the national standard. The industrial systems of Qinba medicine, green food, Ankang silk, Han River hydropower, Jinzhou minerals and so on have been formed basically. Taking "Using Ecotourism to Promote Ankang" as the subject, highlight three traveling brands of "Han River's Culture, Qinba Scenery, Customs in Ankang", the tourism industry is full of vigor and vitality. Ankang carry out three projects of afforestation, ecological protection and environmental control to maintain and develop a good ecological environment with blue sky and white clouds, green mountains and blue waters in Ankang.

Notes

References

Sources 

 Works cited
 .

External links 
 Ankang City Government official homepage

 
Cities in Shaanxi